Charles-Antoine Coypel (11 July 1694 – 14 June 1752) was a French painter, art commentator, and playwright. He became court painter to the French king and director of the Académie Royale. He inherited the title of Garde des tableaux et dessins du roi (Keeper of the paintings and drawings of the king), a function which combined the role of director and curator of the king's art collection.  He was mainly active in Paris.

Life
He was born in an artistic family as the son of the painter Antoine Coypel and grandson of the painter Noël Coypel. He lived almost his whole life at the Louvre, from the age of three when his father was granted a brevêt de logement (residence permit) in 1697. He was a pupil of his father and was simultaneously agréé and reçu (which meant he became a full member) at the Académie royale de peinture et de sculpture on 31 August 1715.

He inherited his father’s design and painting duties as premier peintre du roi (First Painter to the King) at the French court when his father died in 1722. He became premier peintre du roi and director of the Académie Royale in 1747. He worked on several commissions for paintings for the royal Palace of Versailles, and for Madame de Pompadour, the king’s mistress.

Work

Coypel was an excellent tapestry designer. He designed tapestries for the Gobelins manufactory. His most successful tapestries were created from a series illustrating Don Quixote. Coypel was the first to illustrate Don Quixote in a sophisticated manner. These illustrations were painted as cartoons for tapestries, and were engraved and published in a deluxe folio in Paris in 1724. Coypel created twenty-eight small paintings for these tapestries over a number of years. Each of the paintings was used as the centrepiece of a larger area that was richly decorated with birds, small animals, and garlands of flowers on a patterned background. Over two hundred pieces of the Don Quixote series were woven between 1714 and 1794. He received a commission to design a series of theatrical scenes for tapestries for the queen of Poland in 1747. Coypel also wrote prose, several comedies, two tragedies, and some poetry.

Alongside his painting career, Coypel wrote some forty plays between 1717 and 1747. Only Les Folies de Cardenio (1720) was published. It was staged at the Tuileries Palace in 1721. In La Poésie et la Peinture (Allegory of Painting), allegorical comedy in three acts, the artist compared the qualities of both arts. The painter also realized works on the theme of the theater, including portraits of the Comédie-Française players Charlotte Desmares and Adrienne Lecouvreur.

References

Further reading 

General studies
Adapted from a following source: 
 
 
 
Reference works

External links

1694 births
1752 deaths
18th-century French painters
French male painters
18th-century French dramatists and playwrights
French tapestry artists
Painters from Paris
Writers from Paris
18th-century French male writers
Premiers peintres du Roi
French art curators
18th-century French male artists